The Egyptian mouse-tailed bat (Rhinopoma cystops) is a species of mouse-tailed bat found in North Africa and the Middle East.

Taxonomy
It was described as a new species in 1903 by British zoologist Oldfield Thomas. The holotype had been collected near Luxor, Egypt by Charles Rothschild. It was long considered a subspecies of the lesser mouse-tailed bat, R. hardwickii, but in 2007, Hulva et al. published that it should be considered a full species.

Description

Biology and ecology
It is a colonial species, forming aggregations consisting of a few individuals or as many as one thousand. It utilizes both caves and human structures as roosts.

Range and habitat
Its range includes several countries and regions in North Africa and the Middle East: Algeria, Burkina Faso, Cameroon, Djibouti, Egypt, Eritrea, Ethiopia, Israel, Jordan, Libya, Mali, Mauritania, Morocco, Niger, Nigeria, Oman, Saudi Arabia, Senegal, Somalia, South Sudan, Sudan, Syria, Tunisia, Western Sahara, and Yemen.

Conservation
As of 2017, it is evaluated as a least-concern species by the IUCN.
It meets the criteria for this classification because it has a wide geographic range and no major threats to its existence are known.

References

Mammals of West Africa
Taxa named by Oldfield Thomas
Mammals described in 1903
Bats of Africa
Rhinopomatidae
Mammals of Cameroon
Mammals of Djibouti
Vertebrates of Egypt
Mammals of Eritrea
Mammals of Ethiopia
Fauna of Israel
Fauna of Jordan
Fauna of Palestine (region)
Fauna of Libya
Mammals of North Africa
Bats of the Arabian Peninsula
Mammals of Somalia
Mammals of South Sudan
Mammals of Sudan
Vertebrates of Syria
Fauna of Western Sahara